Ahmadvand (also Romanized as Aḩmadvand; also known as Aḩmadābād) is a village in Miyan Darband Rural District, in the Central District of Kermanshah County, Kermanshah Province, Iran. At the 2006 census, its population was 612, in 119 families.

References 

Populated places in Kermanshah County